The Billy O'Connor Show was a Canadian variety television series which aired on CBC Television from 1954 to 1956.

Premise
Billy O'Connor, a jazz musician, hosted this series with a small house band - Vic Centro (accordion), Kenny Gill (guitar) and Jackie Richardson (bass). Jack Duffy and Bill Isbister also made frequent appearances on this series. O'Connor was promoted in CBC publicity as "a man you'd like to get to know".

Juliette joined O'Connor on the series as a regular performer from 20 August 1955. However, their adversarial relationship led to the end of O'Connor's series in May 1956 and the debut of Juliette's own series in the same time slot that October.  Sylvia Murphy became the vocalist for future series with O'Connor.

Scheduling
This 20-minute series was broadcast on Saturdays at 11:10 p.m. from 16 October 1954 to 19 May 1956, following the NHL hockey broadcast.

References

External links
 

CBC Television original programming
1954 Canadian television series debuts
1956 Canadian television series endings
1950s Canadian variety television series
Black-and-white Canadian television shows